This is a list of members of the House of Commons of Canada in the 38th Parliament of Canada (October 4, 2004 to November 29, 2005).

Bold text denotes cabinet ministers
Italic text denotes party leaders

Members

Alberta

British Columbia

Manitoba

New Brunswick

Newfoundland and Labrador

Nova Scotia

Ontario

Prince Edward Island

Quebec

Saskatchewan

The North

† Speaker.

Changes in party affiliation
The party standings changed as follows:

Former members of the 38th Parliament

Members of the House of Commons in the 38th Parliament of Canada who left their seats.

House Members Of The 38th Parliament Of Canada, List Of
38